Hip-Hop Evolution is a Canadian music documentary series that originally aired on HBO Canada in 2016. Hosted by Juno Award-winning artist Shad, the series profiles the history of hip-hop music through interviews with many of the genre's leading cultural figures. The series is produced by Darby Wheeler, Rodrigo Bascuñán, Russell Peters, Scot McFadyen, Sam Dunn and Nelson George. It won the 2016 Peabody Award, and the 2017 International Emmy Award for Best Arts Programming.

The series was screened at the 2016 Hot Docs Canadian International Documentary Festival before being picked up for broadcast by HBO. In December 2016, it was added to Netflix for international distribution.

Content
Hip-Hop Evolution features in-depth, personal interviews with the progenitors of DJing, rapping, and production, culminating in what is now taken to be hip hop music and rap, adding to the existing understanding of hip-hop's earliest decades. Such original artists, producers, DJs, and promoters include: DJ Kool Herc, Coke La Rock, Grandmaster Flash and The Furious Five, Fab Five Freddy, Marley Marl, Afrika Bambaataa, Kool Moe Dee, Kurtis Blow, Doug E. Fresh, Whodini, Warp 9, DJ Hollywood, Spoonie Gee, The Sugarhill Gang, Russell Simmons, Slick Rick, LL Cool J, Rick Rubin, Dana Dane, Vanilla Ice, Public Enemy, Michael Jackson, Perri "Pebbles" Reid, Jermaine Dupri & The Fat Boys.

The first episode documents the history of the inceptive hip-hop party at 1520 Sedgwick Avenue in The Bronx where DJ Kool Herc, who thus emerged as a godfather of the tradition, DJed his sister's birthday party.

The series went on to feature some of the most influential artists of the genre, without whom its current form would not exist, such as Public Enemy, Beastie Boys, N.W.A, Ice-T, Rakim, Big Daddy Kane and LL Cool J, as well as documenting Schoolly D, from Philadelphia, as the influence for gangsta rap on the West Coast, as told by the words of Ice T. It limits its telling of the history at that point, as it documents that was the turning point in which Hip Hop had turned from an underground movement within music to a mainstream genre, that ripples its influence throughout contemporary culture.

Awards
In 2016 the series was awarded a Peabody Award. The series garnered four Canadian Screen Award nominations at the 5th Canadian Screen Awards in 2017, for Best Biography or Arts Documentary Program or Series, Best Editing in a Documentary Program or Series (Steve Taylor and Mark Staunton) Best Writing in a Documentary Program or Series (Rodrigo Bascunan) and Best Direction in a Documentary or Factual Series (Darby Wheeler). It won the awards for Best Biography or Arts Documentary and Best Editing. The series was also awarded with a 2017 International Emmy for Best Arts Programming.

Episodes

Season 1 (2016)

Season 2 (2018)

Season 3 (2019)

Season 4 (2020)

References

External links
Hip-Hop Evolution

2016 Canadian television series debuts
2010s Canadian documentary television series
2020s Canadian documentary television series
Crave original programming
2010s Canadian music television series
2020s Canadian music television series
Canadian Screen Award-winning television shows
Documentary television series about music
History of hip hop
2010s Black Canadian television series
2020s Black Canadian television series
English-language Netflix original programming
Netflix original documentary television series